Tenor Gladness, is an album by saxophonists Lew Tabackin and Warne Marsh recorded in 1976 and originally released on the Japanese Disco Mate label before being released in the U. S. on Inner City Records.

Reception 

The Allmusic review commented: "it finds both Marsh and Tabackin in competitive and creative form".

Track listing 
 "Basic #2" (Lew Tabackin) – 6:42
 "Easy" (Warne Marsh) – 5:59
 "March of the Tadpoles" (Toshiko Akiyoshi) – 6:20
 "Hangin' Loose"(Akiyoshi) – 8:18
 "New-ance"(Tabackin) – 3:58
 "Basic #1" (Marsh) – 7:32

Personnel 
Lew Tabackin (tracks 1 & 3-6), Warne Marsh (tracks 1-4 & 6) – tenor saxophone
Toshiko Akiyoshi – piano (track 2)
John Heard – bass
Larry Bunker – drums

References 

Lew Tabackin albums
Warne Marsh albums
1977 albums
Inner City Records albums
Collaborative albums